General Roca Department is a  department of Córdoba Province in Argentina.

The provincial subdivision has a population of about 33,323 inhabitants in an area of 12,659 km², and its capital city is Villa Huidobro.

Settlements
Buchardo
Del Campillo
Huinca Renancó
Italó
Jovita
Mattaldi
Nicolás Bruzzone
Onagoyti
Pincén
Ranqueles
Villa Huidobro
Villa Sarmiento
Villa Valeria

Departments of Córdoba Province, Argentina